Chadstone High School (State School number 7710) was a former Victorian Government high school, located in the Melbourne suburb of Chadstone. Chadstone High School was often referred to as "Chaddy High".

History
The school was established in the late 1950s in what was then a rapidly growing outer-suburban area. It initially operated out of demountable classrooms until a purpose-built three storey school building was finished in the early 1960s. The RK Senior Hall (named after one of the school's principals) was constructed in the 1970s.

It was established adjacent to the Chadstone Park Primary School. The school also took students from other neighbouring primary schools including Solway Primary School, Lloyd Street, Murrumbeena and Hughesdale.

The demographics of the area changed from the 1960s through to the 1980s with the area's population ageing. The school's population declined and the school was closed in 1991.

School Symbols and Uniform

Chadstone's symbol was the mythical Phoenix, a fabled bird that rose from the ashes of defeat. The Phoenix became the name of the annual school magazine.

The name Phoenix lives on through Phoenix Park which is located on the school's site.

The school's motto was "Faith and Decision", as celebrated in the chorus of the school song...

"Let us resolve, like the phoenix to arise
From ashes of our lesser selves and strive
Throughout our lives, with honour and with truth
In faith and decision wise"  (composed by Haslam, Dombrain and Lamb.)

Boys wore long or short grey trousers with a white shirt and black shoes (or desert boots). A maroon blazer and ties were worn in the 1960s and early 1970s but their use abated in the 1970s and a grey jumper became standard winter uniform.  No school cap or hat was worn.

Girls wore a chequered dress in summer and a grey skirt, white shirt and grey jumper in winter.

At formal events, such as concerts by the school's band or orchestra, boys and girls wore maroon blazers with the school emblem on the breast pocket.

Sporting uniforms were variations of red and black, or sometimes red, black, and white. Typical was a red tee-shirt and black shorts for athletics.

Famous Ex-Students
Richmond Football Club player David Cloke attended Chadstone High School.
Other VFL footballers of note who attended the school in the 60's and 70's included: Alan Martello (played 223 games for Hawthorn between '70 and '80 and a three time Premiership player in '71, '76, '78. He then played 32 games for Richmond '81-'83 where he played in the losing '82 grand final team), Anthony Smith played 4 senior and 82 reserve grade games (1968–74) for Richmond Football Club, Laurie Fowler (Played 49 games with Richmond between '71-'74 and member of the '73 Premiership team who then played  140 games at Melbourne ('75-'81) where he was a three time best and fairest winner, and David's older brother, Peter Cloke (Richmond then North Adelaide). Denis Clark (born 22 April 1950) played with Melbourne. Clark, was a centreman recruited from East Malvern, played with Melbourne for eight seasons, from '68 - '75, playing 113 games. He then went to Sandringham, where he played until 1980, captaining the club in his final two seasons. His son, Michael Clark, played one game for Melbourne, in '02. Wayne Bevan also played 20 games with Hawthorn '73 -'75 and then left and played for Central Districts in the SANFL, before returning to play for Dandenong in the VFA. Graeme Spark played 2 games for Hawthorn in '76.
David Broad played District Cricket for Melbourne "MCC". He also Captained the club and opened the batting for Victoria, playing 13 matches with a batting Average of 34.94. He was also the club president - 2002 to 2004.

Redevelopment
The school itself, apart from the RK Senior Hall, was demolished  in the 1990s and the site redeveloped as Phoenix Park.

Notes

External links
 Wikimapia view of the site
 Phoenix Park site
 Ian Gardener's Chadstone High School site 
 Mark Lewandowski's Chadstone High School site

Public schools in Melbourne
Defunct schools in Victoria (Australia)
Educational institutions established in the 1950s
Educational institutions disestablished in 1991